Claire Brayton Bird (October 27, 1868August 15, 1954) was an American lawyer from Wausau who served four years as a Republican member of the Wisconsin State Senate from the 25th District (Langlade and Marathon Counties).

Early life and education

Bird was born on October 27, 1868, in Jefferson, Wisconsin. He graduated from Wayland Academy in Beaver Dam, Wisconsin, the University of Wisconsin, and the University of Wisconsin Law School.

Career
Bird began practicing law in Wausau, Wisconsin.  He was appointed city attorney of Wausau in 1897 and served two years; was vice-president of the Wisconsin State Board of Education from 1917 to 1918, resigning when elected to the Senate; and served as president of the Wisconsin State Bar Association.

Political career
Bird was elected a member of the Senate in 1918, with 5,056 votes to 3,794 for Socialist Christ Bloom.

Personal life 
He married Laura Eaton (1868–1936) in 1892.

Bird's former home, now known as the C. B. Bird House, is listed on the National Register of Historic Places.

References

External links

People from Jefferson, Wisconsin
Politicians from Beaver Dam, Wisconsin
Politicians from Wausau, Wisconsin
Wisconsin state court judges
Republican Party Wisconsin state senators
Wisconsin lawyers
University of Wisconsin–Madison alumni
University of Wisconsin Law School alumni
1868 births
1954 deaths
Wayland Academy, Wisconsin alumni